Village Law is a set of rules regarding the conduct of government villages with consideration has evolved in various forms that need to be protected and empowered to become strong, advanced, independent, and democratic so as to create a strong foundation in carrying out governance and development towards a just and prosperous society. This Law also regulates the principle of setting materials, Position and type of Village, the Village Planning, Authority of the Village, the Village Governance, rights and Duties of the Village and Village Communities, Village Regulation, Financial Asset Village and Village, Rural Development and Rural Area Development, village-owned enterprises, Cooperative Village, the Village Society Institute and the Institute of Indigenous Village, as well as Development and Control. In addition, this Act also set up with a special provision that applies only to the Village People as set out in Chapter XIII.

One of the most crucial points in the discussion of the Bill Village, is related to the budget allocation for the village, in the explanation of Article 72 Paragraph 2 of the Rural Finance. The number of allocations directly to the village, set 10 percent of the funds transfer and outside the region. Then consider the amount of population, poverty, area, geographical difficulties. It this in order to improve rural communities because each country is expected to get about 1.4 billion fund based on the calculation of the explanation that the village law, 10 percent of the area according to the state budget and the transfer to the village of Rp 59, 2 trillion, coupled with funds from the budget by 10 percent around Rp 45.4 trillion. The total funding for the village is Rp 104, 6 trillion, which would be divided into 72 thousand villages across Indonesia.

General Provisions

In general the provisions of Law No. 32 of 2004 on regional government stated, village or called other names, hereinafter referred to as the village is the unity of the legal community who have boundaries that are authorized to regulate and manage the interests of the local community, based on their origin and local customs are recognized and respected in the unitary system of government of the Republic of Indonesia. the law also affirmed the unity of the legal community is the village which has boundaries that are authorized to regulate and manage government affairs, interests of local communities based community initiatives, and the origin of rights or customary rights are recognized and respected in the unitary system of government of the Republic of Indonesia. Furthermore, in Government Regulation No. 72 of 2005, the establishment of the village only by indicator of population distinguished by island and immediately became the definitive village. In the new village law, an indicator of population is no longer only in the island, but more detailed requirements such as population greater than ever before. If before enough with a population of 2,500 people, with the Law on compulsory village of 4,500 people and in the absence of legislation preparations village for 1–3 years.

In addition, there are general provisions related to indigenous villages, namely the unity of indigenous people and their right to traditional real still life, whether they are territorial, genealogical, and that is functional. It is intended as a unity of indigenous communities and their traditional rights deemed in accordance with the development of society and a unity of indigenous communities and their traditional rights in accordance with the principles of the Unitary Republic of Indonesia. Surely there is a special provision that defines the existence of the village.

The purpose of the Village
The Government of the Republic of Indonesia was established to protect all the people of Indonesia and the entire country of Indonesia, promote the general welfare, the intellectual life of the nation and participate in the establishment of a world order based on freedom, eternal peace, and social justice.

Law No. 25 Year 2004 on National Development Planning System has set the National Long-Term Development Plan which is a translation of the aim of the state government of Indonesia. The village has a right to their origin and traditional rights to regulate and manage the interests of the community contribute to realize the ideals of independence based on the Constitution of the Republic of Indonesia (1945) need to be protected and empowered to become strong, advanced, independent, and democratic so as to create a solid foundation in carrying out governance and development towards an equitable, and prosperous. Thus, the purpose of the stipulation setting in the village of this Act is a further elaboration of the provisions referred to in Article 18 paragraph (7) and Article 18B paragraph (2) of the Constitution of the Republic of Indonesia (1945), namely:
 Gives recognition and respect for the existing village with diversity before and after the establishment of the Republic of Indonesia;
 Provide clarity and legal certainty of the status of the village in the constitutional system of the Republic of Indonesia in order to bring justice for all Indonesian people;
 preserve and promote the customs, traditions, and culture of the village;
 Encourage initiatives, movements, and community participation and the potential for the development of village assets together for the welfare of the village;
 Village Government formed a professional, efficient and effective, open, and responsible;
 Improve public services for citizens in order to accelerate the realization of village public welfare;
 Increase the resilience of social and cultural village in order to realize the villagers were able to maintain social cohesion as part of the national defense;
 Improve the economy of the village community as well as addressing gaps national development; and
 Strengthen village communities as subjects of development.

See also

Villages of Indonesia
Subdivisions of Indonesia

References

 01
Village
Decentralization
Village